Veronika Eduardovna Kudermetova (born 24 April 1997) is a Russian professional tennis player. 
She has a career-high singles ranking of world No. 9, achieved on 24 October 2022, and a best WTA doubles ranking of No. 2, reached on 6 June 2022. She also has reached a Grand Slam final, at the 2021 Wimbledon Championships in women's doubles with Elena Vesnina, and won 2022 WTA Finals with Elise Mertens.

Kudermetova won her first WTA Tour singles title at the 2021 Charleston Open, and her first WTA doubles title at the 2019 Wuhan Open, partnering Duan Yingying.
She made her WTA Tour main-draw debut in singles at the 2018 Porsche Tennis Grand Prix, and in doubles at the 2014 Kremlin Cup, partnering with Evgeniya Rodina.

Playing for Russia Fed Cup team, Kudermetova has a win–loss record of 3–4.

Personal life
Kudermetova was born to Eduard Kudermetov, a Russian national ice hockey champion. She started playing tennis at the age of eight. Her younger sister Polina Kudermetova (born 2003) is also a tennis player.

Kudermetova is married to tennis coach and former player Sergei Demekhine. They started dating in 2015 despite Demekhine returning to being her coach again since 2012, on which Kudermetova commented in 2020: "At the age of 16 I just liked him but I didn't even think about anything more. Probably, it's my upbringing that affected. Such thoughts had been unacceptable to me".

Tennis career

2013
Partnering Evgeniya Rodina, Kudermetova won her first $50k tournament at the Kazan Summer Cup, defeating Alexandra Artamonova and Martina Borecká in the final. There, she also reached the semifinals in singles as a wildcard.

2014: Successful transition to the ITF Circuit
Kudermetova reached consecutive $10k finals at Antalya at the start of the year, and after several strong performances, she cracked the world's top 500 for the first time in her career. Playing in her first $100k tournament at the President's Cup, she reached the quarterfinals before falling to eventual champion, Vitalia Diatchenko.

She ended the year as the No. 343 in the rankings with a 24–14 win-loss record, lifting her maiden ITF title in the process.

2015: Struggles for a breakthrough
The 2015 season saw Kudermetova failing to win a single title on the ITF Circuit as she had a disappointing 15–15 win–loss record with just one final reached. Her year-end ranking was 400.

2016: Success on the ITF Circuit, WTA Challenger debut
After a lackluster start, Kudermetova made her first final of the year at Andijan in May. It was followed by consecutive $25k titles in Imola and Astana, ensuring that she moved into the world's top 300 for the first time. A fourth final of the season in Telavi marked her continuous rise. Her ranking soon made it possible for a direct admission into the main draw of the Taipei Challenger, her debut on a WTA 125 tournament. She won her first match against Varatchaya Wongteanchai before losing in the second round.

Overall, she enjoyed a 34–18 win–loss record in 2016, with a total of two ITF Circuit titles. Her year-end ranking improved by a total of 190 spots, ending at the 210th spot.

2017: Major & WTA Tour debut
Her Grand Slam debut came at the Australian Open, where she lost in the first round of qualifying. Attempting a transition onto the WTA Tour, she played qualifying in multiple events but failed to reach the main draw in all of them. Kudermetova won her first qualifying round at the French Open but fell in her next match. She reached her first WTA 125 quarterfinal, at the Taipei Challenger to end off the year.

Kudermetova had a 28–24 win-loss record for the year, failing to reach any finals but recorded more appearances on the WTA Tour.

2018: Top 30 win, first WTA Tour main-draw win
After starting the year with a triumph at the $25k event at the Keio Challenger, she qualified for her first WTA event at the Porsche Tennis Grand Prix, a Premier tournament. Riding on her momentum, Kudermetova stunned top-30 player Carla Suárez Navarro in the first round before putting up a strong performance against eventual champion and top-ten player Karolína Plíšková.

She reached the final round of qualifying at the French Open for the first time in her career, where she fell to Barbora Krejčíková. Another big win soon followed as she beat defending champion Anett Kontaveit in the first round of the Rosmalen Grass Court Championships. Furthermore, she  stunned Belinda Bencic in her next match, reaching her first WTA quarterfinal. She reached another WTA quarterfinal at the Ladies Championship Gstaad, where she defeated Viktória Kužmová before falling to Eugenie Bouchard, in straight sets.

She had a 34–23 win-loss record for the year, gaining first success on the WTA Tour.

2019: Top 40 singles debut, first Premier-5 title & top 25 in doubles

Kudermetova started the year with a quarterfinal run at the Shenzhen Open after qualifying for the main draw, defeating higher-ranked compatriot Anastasia Pavlyuchenkova in the process. She qualified for the main draw at the Australian Open for the first time in her career, losing to Sofia Kenin in the first round.

At the WTA 125 event in Guadalajara, Kudermetova was unseeded but still managed to lift the biggest title of her career by defeating Marie Bouzková, 6–2, 6–0 in the final. Consecutive WTA quarterfinals came at the Ladies Open Lugano and the İstanbul Cup.

Her first major main-draw win came at the French Open when she beat Caroline Wozniacki, the 13th seed, in the first round. After beating Zarina Diyas in the second, Kudermetova was defeated by veteran Kaia Kanepi in the third round, despite winning the first set.

In July 2019, she reached the second round at Wimbledon, where she was beaten by Wozniacki. Prior to that, Kudermetova excelled at Rosmalen, making the semifinals where she was defeated by eventual champion Alison Riske.

In September, seeded eighth, she and Duan Yingying won the doubles title at the Wuhan Open, beating newly crowned US Open champions Elise Mertens and Aryna Sabalenka in the final. It was their first time playing together, and Kudemetova's first doubles title. It took her at world No. 24 on 30 September 2019 in the doubles rankings. She reached third round in the singles competition, which also took her to a career-high singles ranking of world No. 42. In the tournament, Kudermetova beat Belinda Bencic for her first career top-ten win.

On a fantastic Asian swing, Kudermetova reached two semifinals at the Japan Women's Open and the Tianjin Open, respectively. To end off her first full season on the WTA Tour, she stunned world No. 4, Elina Svitolina, in the second round of the Kremlin Cup and reached the quarterfinals as a result, falling to Anastasia Pavlyuchenkova. 

A win-loss record of 44–25 saw Kudermetova ending the year (world No. 41) as the second highest-ranked Russian, lagging just behind Pavlyuchenkova, having reached a career-high of world No. 39 in singles on 11 November 2019 with three WTA semifinals and one WTA 125 title. She finished the year at No. 25 in doubles.

2020: Progress in singles before and in doubles rankings after COVID

Kudermetova began the year at the Brisbane International. She lost in the final round of qualifying to Marie Bouzková. Seeded fifth at the Hobart International, she reached the semifinals where she was defeated by fourth seed Zhang Shuai. As a result, she reached again the top 40 in singles, on 20 January 2020. At the Australian Open, she lost in the first round to Sara Sorribes Tormo. Despite the loss, she reached a new career-high of world No. 38, on 3 February 2020.

Playing for Russia in the Fed Cup qualifying tie against Romania, Kudermetova lost both of her rubbers to Ana Bogdan and Jaqueline Cristian. Despite those losses, Russia won the tie 3–2. In St. Petersburg, she was defeated in the second round by second seed, defending and eventual champion, Kiki Bertens. Getting past qualifying at the Dubai Tennis Championships, she lost in the second round to ninth seed Garbiñe Muguruza. At the Qatar Open, she was defeated in the second round by fourth seed Belinda Bencic. The WTA cancelled tournaments from March to July due to the COVID-19 pandemic.

When the WTA resumed tournament play in August, Kudermetova competed at the Prague Open. Seeded eighth, she lost in the first round to Eugenie Bouchard. At the Western & Southern Open, she stunned top seed and 2016 champion, Karolína Plíšková, in the second round. She was defeated in the third round by 14th seed Elise Mertens. Seeded 29th at the US Open, she lost in the first round to Iga Świątek. In doubles, she partnered with compatriot Anna Blinkova; they both reached the semifinals of a Grand Slam for the first time in their career where they lost to Laura Siegemund and Vera Zvonareva. Following this run, she achieved her career-high doubles ranking of world No. 22 on 14 September 2020.

Playing in Rome, Kudermetova was defeated in the first round by Barbora Strýcová. At the French Open, she lost in the second round to 13th seed Petra Martić.

Coming through qualifying at the first edition of the Ostrava Open, Kudermetova upset second seed Karolína Plíšková in the second round. In the quarterfinals, she was defeated by Jennifer Brady. Her final tournament of the season was at the Upper Austria Ladies Linz. Seeded fifth, she reached the quarterfinals where she lost to second seed and eventual finalist, Elise Mertens.

Kudermetova ended the year ranked No. 46 in singles and No. 24 in doubles.

2021: Maiden title & top 30 in singles, First Major final & top 15 in doubles
Kudermetova started 2021 at the first edition of the Abu Dhabi Open. She stunned second seed Elina Svitolina in the quarterfinals  and defeated Marta Kostyuk in the semifinals. She lost in the final to fourth seed Aryna Sabalenka convincingly, but entered the top 40 for the first time in her career. At the first edition of the Grampians Trophy, she was defeated in the second round by Ann Li. Seeded 32nd at the Australian Open, she lost in the third round to second seed Simona Halep after earning her first main-draw victories in Melbourne. In Adelaide, she was defeated in the first round by Shelby Rogers.

At the Qatar Open, Kudermetova lost in the first round to eventual finalist Garbiñe Muguruza. At Dubai, she was defeated in the second round by sixth seed and 2019 champion, Belinda Bencic. Seeded second in St. Petersburg, she reached the quarterfinals losing to eighth seed and eventual champion, Daria Kasatkina. Seeded 32nd at the Miami Open, she was defeated in the third round by seventh seed Sabalenka once again, although this time she owned a set point.

Seeded 15th at the Charleston Open, Kudermetova won her first WTA singles title, beating Danka Kovinić in the final. Defeating the likes of Sloane Stephens and Paula Badosa, she did not lose more than eight games in a match and won the title without losing a set. She entered the top 30 at a career-high of No. 29 on 12 April 2021. The following week, she won her second doubles title at the İstanbul Cup, partnering Elise Mertens while also reaching the singles semifinals where she lost to Mertens.

Kudermetova reached the third round of the Madrid Open with a top-ten win over defending champion Kiki Bertens, in straight sets. However, despite a tight match, she lost to Petra Kvitová eventually. At the Italian Open, Kudermetova upset Mertens in the first round but fell to world No. 1, Ashleigh Barty, in the third round.

She entered the French Open as one of the dark horses, and navigated a tough first-round win against former semifinalist Amanda Anisimova, in straight sets. However, she was stunned by Kateřina Siniaková in the second round despite leading 5–1 in the final set.

Kudermetova began her grass-court season at the inaugural WTA German Open, where she defeated Karolína Muchová in a high-quality first-round match. She was upset by compatriot Liudmila Samsonova in the second round.

At Wimbledon, she was upset by eventual quarterfinalist Viktorija Golubic 11–9 in the final set, in the first round. In doubles, she partnered Elena Vesnina, and despite being unseeded, they ousted top seeds and reigning French Opens champions and top seed Barbora Krejčíková/Kateřina Siniaková and Caroline Dolehide/Storm Sanders en route to the final, saving match points in both matches. They had also previously beaten the seeded pairing of Coco Gauff and Caty McNally, played under the lights on Centre Court. They lost to the former number-one doubles players and third seeded pair, Hsieh Su-wei and Elise Mertens, in a tight three-set match, despite having two match points. With this successful run, she entered the top 20 in doubles at a career-high of world No. 16 on 12 July 2021.

At the Tokyo Olympics, Kudermetova represented the Russian Olympic Committee in both women's singles and doubles for the first time in her career. In singles, she lost in the first round to seventh seeded Garbiñe Muguruza in a very tight match. In doubles, she again partnered with Vesnina. The pair lost in the semifinal to eventual gold medalists, Krejčíková and Siniaková of the Czech Republic. In the bronze medal match, Vesnina and Kudermetova were defeated by Brazilians Laura Pigossi and Luisa Stefani, despite having four consecutive match points at 9–5 in the super-tiebreak.

Kudermetova snapped a four-match losing streak in singles against Yulia Putintseva at the Canadian Open, coming from 0–3 down in the final set to prevail. Partnering Elena Rybakina for the first time, they reached the doubles semifinal after losing just 14 games in the process.

At the US Open, Kudermetova suffered another first-round exit in the hands of Sorana Cîrstea, one of the highest-ranked unseeded players in the draw. She lost in the third round of doubles alongside Bethanie Mattek-Sands. The Russian claimed back-to-back singles wins for the first time since May at the Chicago Fall Tennis Classic, defeating Anna Kalinskaya in the first round and ousting Harriet Dart in the second round. She lost to Rybakina in the third round.

Kudermetova reached the third round of the Indian Wells Open for the first time in her career after defeating Samsonova but managed to win just one game against Iga Świątek. However, she achieved success in doubles alongside Rybakina as they defeated fourth seeds Alexa Guarachi and Desirae Krawczyk 10–0 in the super-tiebreak, and Lyudmyla Kichenok and Jeļena Ostapenko to reach the final. They lost to second seeds Hsieh and Mertens in the final.

2022: World No. 9 in singles, WTA Finals & WTA 1000 champion & world No. 2 in doubles
Kudermetova began her season at the Melbourne Summer Set 1, reaching the singles final but lost to Simona Halep, in straight sets. Seeded third in doubles at the Australian Open, she reached the semifinals with new partner Elise Mertens, where they lost to eventual champions Krejčíková and Siniaková. As a result, she made her top-ten debut in doubles at world No. 9, on 31 January 2022. She reached the third round in singles, falling to Maria Sakkari despite having an early lead.

At Dubai, Kudermetova earned her first top-20 win since May 2021 over Victoria Azarenka in the first round. She then earned her first win over fourth seed Garbiñe Muguruza in four attempts, coming from a set down to beat the Spaniard. Kudermetova beat Jil Teichmann to reach her first WTA 500 semifinal since her Charleston triumph, and received a walkover into the final after her scheduled opponent Markéta Vondroušová withdrew. She lost the final to Jeļena Ostapenko, in straight sets but reached a new career in the top 25 of the WTA rankings. At the same tournament, she won the doubles title, partnering Mertens, against Ostapenko and Lyudmyla Kichenok. 
They also reached the final of the WTA 1000 Qatar Ladies Open, with Kudermetova rising to a career-high ranking of No. 6 in doubles after the tournament.

She reached her first career WTA 1000 singles quarterfinal at Indian Wells, beating former world No. 1, Naomi Osaka, in straight sets, and Markéta Vondroušová after nearly three hours of action. However, she lost to defending champion Paula Badosa in the quarterfinals, her first loss to the Spaniard in four meetings. In doubles, Kudermetova and Mertens were stunned in the opening round by Eri Hozumi and Makoto Ninomiya.

Kudermetova reached two more WTA 1000 finals in doubles at the Miami Open, partnering Mertens and at the Italian Open, partnering Anastasia Pavlyuchenkova, where she won her first WTA 1000 title defeating Madrid champions Gabriela Dabrowski and Giuliana Olmos.

At the French Open, she reached a major quarterfinal in singles for the first time in her career, after Paula Badosa retired in the third round and a victory against Madison Keys in three sets, in the fourth. She made also the third round in doubles with Mertens. As a result, she reached a new career-high of world No. 2 in doubles after the conclusion of the tournament on 6 June 2022.

At the Silicon Valley Classic, Kudermetova reached the semifinals by defeating Ons Jabeur in straight sets. At the US Open, she met Ons Jabeur again in the fourth round, but lost in straight sets.

At the Pan Pacific Open, Kudermetova reached the semifinals eventually losing to Zheng Qinwen in three sets. Seeded second at the Jasmin Open, she lost to Alizé Cornet in the semifinals.
In receipt of a first-round bye in Guadalajara, she defeated Donna Vekić and Jelena Ostapenko in straight sets. In the quarterfinals, she fell to Maria Sakkari in a close three set match, which was also a qualifying match for the 2022 WTA Finals. Despite the result, she made her top-10 debut in the WTA rankings at world No. 9 in singles, on 24 October 2022. However, she qualified for the WTA Finals in doubles with Mertens on 13 October 2022 for the first time in her career.

In Fort Worth, Kudermetova along with Mertens raced into the doubles final, as they finish 3-0 in the round robin stage and eased past Desirae Krawczyk/Demi Schuurs in the semifinals. In the final, they came back from 2-7 down in the match-tiebreak to outlast defending champions & six time Grand Slam champions, Krejčíková and Siniaková, and win their third doubles title together.

Kudermetova capped off the best season of her career as she finished the year ranked No. 9 in singles and No. 2 in doubles.

2023: Out of singles top 10, new partnership & WTA 1000 doubles title  
Veronika Kudermetova started the season at the Adelaide International 1, seeded fourth. In her first tournament as a top-10 player, she defeated Amanda Anisimova and Bianca Andreescu in the first two rounds, respectively. However, she was defeated in the quarterfinals by Irina Camelia Begu in straight sets. She continued her good form in Adelaide 2, where she defeated Victoria Azarenka and Danielle Collins in three sets, saving five match points against the latter, to reach the semifinals. After withdrawing from the Adelaide 2 semifinals, Kudermetova was surprisingly knocked out in second round of the Australian Open by qualifier Katie Volynets in three sets.

Kudermetova reached the quarterfinals of the Abu Dhabi Open after beating former doubles partner Elise Mertens. Consistency continued to reflect in her results as she made the last four at the Qatar Total Open, beating Barbora Krejčíková in 3 hours and earning her first Top 10 win of the year against Coco Gauff. However, she lost to World No.1 Iga Świątek, winning just one game in the semifinal.

In doubles, Kudermetova partnered Liudmila Samsonova for the 2023 season. They lost in the first round in Adelaide and fell to fourth seeds Storm Sanders and former doubles partner Elise Mertens in the second round of the Australian Open. However, they won their first title together at the Dubai Tennis Championships, defending her title from 2022.

Fed Cup / Billie Jean King Cup
Playing for the Russia Fed Cup team, Kudermetova has a win–loss record of 3–4. She made her debut in February 2014, losing to Australia's Samantha Stosur in straight sets in their World Group first-round tie. She was also nominated to represent her country during the 2018 Fed Cup World Group II, but was only selected to play a dead doubles rubber alongside Anna Kalinskaya.

Now known as the Billie Jean King Cup, Veronika was selected as the second singles player for Russia in their qualifying round against Romania for a place in the Finals. However, she was beaten by the lower-ranked Ana Bogdan and Jaqueline Cristian. Nonetheless, Russia still managed to triumph 3–2 in the tie and book their spot in the Finals. As the top-ranked doubles player and third-ranked singles player for Russia, she was selected as part of Russia's roster for the Finals in Prague. In the Finals, Kudermetova won all three of her doubles rubbers partnering Liudmila Samsonova, helping Russia win their first title since 2008.

Endorsements
Kudermetova was endorsed by Nike as a junior. After wearing Nike and Asics clothes without any personal contract with the brands, Kudermetova became endorsed by Armani for clothing in 2020, becoming the EA7 Brand Ambassador.

Career statistics

Grand Slam performance timelines

Singles
Current through the 2023 Australian Open.

Doubles

Grand Slam tournament finals

Doubles: 1 (runner-up)

Year-end championships finals

Doubles: 1 (title)

Olympic medal rounds

Doubles: 1 (4th place)

Awards
The Russian Cup in the nominations:
Team of the Year – Girls Under-14: 2011;
Team of the Year – Girls Under-16: 2013;
Olympians-2020;
Team of the Year: 2021.

Notes

References

External links

 
 
 

1997 births
Living people
Sportspeople from Kazan
Russian female tennis players
Universiade medalists in tennis
Universiade bronze medalists for Russia
Medalists at the 2015 Summer Universiade
Olympic tennis players of Russia 
Tennis players at the 2020 Summer Olympics
Volga Tatars
Tatar sportspeople
Tatar people of Russia